Fausto Preysler (born 14 February 1914, died before 2007) was a Filipino sailor. He competed at the 1960 Summer Olympics and the 1964 Summer Olympics.

References

External links
 

1914 births
Year of death missing
Filipino male sailors (sport)
Olympic sailors of the Philippines
Sailors at the 1960 Summer Olympics – Dragon
Sailors at the 1964 Summer Olympics – Dragon
Sportspeople from Bulacan